S70 or S-70 may refer to:

Aircraft 
 Sikorsky S-70, an American military helicopter family
 SIPA S.70, a French prototype transport aircraft
 Sukhoi S-70 Okhotnik-B, a Russian stealth UAV

Automobiles 
 BMW S70, an automobile engine
 Daihatsu Hijet (S70), a Japanese kei truck
 Jinbei S70, a Chinese crossover
 Toyota Crown (S70), a Japanese sedan
 Traum S70, a Chinese crossover
 Volvo S70, a compact executive car

Other uses 
 Canon PowerShot S70, a digital camera
 County Route S70 (Bergen County, New Jersey)
 , a submarine of the Royal Australian Navy
 Siemens S70, also Avanto S70, a light rail vehicle
 S70, a postcode district for Barnsley, England